Elasa is an island that can be found northeast of Crete in the Aegean Sea, about  from the palm tree forest of Vai. It is rocky and uninhabited covering . Administratively it comes within the Itanos municipality in Lasithi.

Environmentally protected area
Elasa is a neighbour of the Dionysades islands and is part of an environmentally protected area with many rare plants and animals including the Mediterranean monk seal.

See also
List of islands of Greece

References

External links

Elasa on the map

Landforms of Lasithi
Uninhabited islands of Crete
Mediterranean islands
Islands of Greece